Cosendai Adventist University  is a  private Christian university belonging to the Seventh-day Adventist education system.

History
Cosendai Adventist University was founded in 1996 after the dislocation of Adventist University of Central Africa

See also

 Seventh-day Adventist education
List of Seventh-day Adventist colleges and universities

References

External links 
Official Website

Universities in Cameroon
Educational institutions established in 1996
Universities and colleges affiliated with the Seventh-day Adventist Church
1996 establishments in Cameroon